Coseley railway station is located in the Coseley area of the borough of Dudley, West Midlands, England.  It is situated on the Rugby-Birmingham-Stafford branch of the West Coast Main Line.  The station, and all trains serving it, are operated by West Midlands Trains.

History 
The present Coseley station opened in 1902.  It replaced an earlier station, named Deepfields and Coseley, which opened in 1852 and was situated  along the track.

Services 
Coseley is served by two train services per hour which are the local all stopping services to Walsall via Birmingham New Street. These services terminate at Wolverhampton on the return.  Previously the station was served by trains to Shrewsbury and Liverpool Lime Street but the stop on these services was withdrawn in 2020 due largely to the COVID-19 travel restrictions.

References

External links 

Rail Around Birmingham: Coseley railway station

Railway stations in Dudley
DfT Category E stations
Former London and North Western Railway stations
Railway stations in Great Britain opened in 1902
Railway stations served by West Midlands Trains